Miguel Gonzalez (born September 25, 1987) is an American former soccer player of Mexican descent.

Career

Youth and Amateur
Gonzalez spent two years in the Santos Laguna youth system, before joining the Bradenton Academy in 2006, subsequently playing two seasons for the Bradenton Academics in the USL Premier Development League.

Professional
Gonzalez became the youngest player on the New England Revolution when he was signed to a developmental contract on July 20, 2006. Having failed to make a break into the Revolution first team, Gonzalez was loaned out USL Second Division side New Hampshire Phantoms, and made his debut for them on 23 June 2007. He was waived by New England at the end of the year, having never made a Major League Soccer appearance.

Gonzalez spent 2008 playing for Potros Chetumal, the minor-league affiliate of Primera División de México side Atlante. He re-signed for his first club, Bradenton Academics of the USL Premier Development League, for the 2009 season. Later he joined Mexican side Correcaminos UAT, but never played a match for them.

References

External links
 

1987 births
Living people
American soccer players
IMG Academy Bradenton players
Soccer players from Miami
New England Revolution players
Seacoast United Phantoms players
USL Second Division players
USL League Two players
Association football midfielders